The selenate ion is .

Selenates are analogous to sulfates and have similar chemistry.  They are highly soluble in aqueous solutions at ambient temperatures.

Unlike sulfate, selenate is a somewhat good oxidizer; it can be reduced to selenite or selenium.

In strongly acidic conditions, the hydrogen selenate ion, is formed. It corresponds to the selenic acid, H2SeO4, which is a strong acid and can in its concentrated form dissolve gold.

The element selenium exhibits several valence states.  Selenate is the least reduced, followed by selenite, and elemental selenium; selenide is even more reduced than elemental selenium.  The valence state is an important factor to the toxicity of selenium.  Selenate is the form required by organisms that need selenium as a micronutrient.  These organisms have the ability to acquire, metabolize and excrete selenium.  The level at which selenium becomes toxic varies from species to species and is related to other environmental factors like pH and alkalinity that influence the concentration of selenite over selenate.

Selenate and other forms of selenium are highest in areas where ancient seas have evaporated.  These areas are enriched in selenium and over millennia, biologic adaptation has occurred.

References

 
Selenium(VI) compounds